Cephalorhynchus is a genus in the dolphin family Delphinidae.

Extant species
It consists of four species:

The species have similar physical features—they are small, generally playful, blunt-nosed dolphins—but they are found in distinct geographical locations.

A phylogenetic analysis by  indicated the two species traditionally assigned to the genus Lagenorhynchus, the hourglass dolphin L. cruciger and Peale's dolphin L. australis are actually phylogenetically nested among the species of Cephalorhynchus, and they suggest these two species should be transferred to the genus Cephalorhynchus.  Some acoustic and morphological data support this arrangement, at least with respect to Peale's dolphin.

Peale's dolphin also shares with several Cephalorhynchus species the possession of a distinct white "armpit" marking behind the pectoral fin.

References

 
 

 
Oceanic dolphins
Cetacean genera
Animals that use echolocation
Taxa named by John Edward Gray